Wes Ball (born October 28, 1980) is an American film director, visual effects artist and graphic artist. He is best known for directing the 2014 film The Maze Runner, based on James Dashner's novel. Ball also directed the sequel, Maze Runner: The Scorch Trials, which opened in theaters on September 18, 2015, and the third film, Maze Runner: The Death Cure, which opened on January 11, 2018.

Education
Ball attended Crescent City High School and graduated in 1999. He graduated from the Florida State University College of Motion Picture Arts with a Bachelor of Fine Arts in 2002. In 2003, he won a Student Academy Award for his short animated film A Work in Progress.

Career
Ball got his start as a Hollywood filmmaker with an animated short named Ruin, which executives at 20th Century Fox saw and offered him the job to direct the adaptation to The Maze Runner. The Maze Runner would be Ball's first feature film. Made on a budget of $34 million, the film pulled in $348 million in box office receipts. Not long after the success of the film, Ball signed a first look deal with 20th Century Fox under his OddBall Entertainment banner.

Ball is attached to direct a film adaptation of Fall of Gods, a crowdfunded illustrated novel from Denmark-based Mood Studios.

In 2017, Ball was hired to direct a live-action/VFX-hybrid adaptation of Mouse Guard, at 20th Century Fox with a script by Gary Whitta and T.S. Nowlin, while Matt Reeves, Ross Richie and Stephen Christy served as producers. Production was expected to begin in May 2019, but the project was pulled from production two weeks before filming began.

In December 2019, Walt Disney Studios Motion Pictures and Fox hired Ball to develop and direct a new film in the Planet of the Apes reboot series, as Matt Reeves, director of the previous two, was too busy with his film The Batman to return. More recently, his production company OddBall Entertainment moved to Paramount Pictures.

In May 2021, Ball was set to direct The Time Runner a feature adaptation of the novella of the same name by Michael Sherman. In March 2022, Ball was set to produce a film based on a yet-unspecified H. G. Wells book.

Filmography

Other credits

References

External links

Living people
1980 births
Film directors from Florida
American graphic designers
Visual effects artists
Place of birth missing (living people)